Entomobryoidea is also the old name of Entomobryomorpha, when these were placed in the "Arthropleona"

The Entomobryoidea are a superfamily of springtails (Collembola), tiny hexapods related to insects. In the modern sense, this group is placed in an order called Entomobryomorpha.

This superfamily contains very characteristic species of springtails. They typically possess long legs and antennae, as well as a well-developed furcula.

Systematics
The Entomobryoidea in the old sense – now Entomobryomorpha – were united with the Poduroidea (now Poduromorpha) in a group called "Arthropleona", but this has more recently turned out to be paraphyletic. Actually the Entomobryomorpha, the Poduromorpha, and the third springtaill lineage – the Symphypleona – are equally distinct from each other. Their treatment at equal taxonomic rank reflects this.

Following a 2008 review of the Entomobryomorpha, the Cyphoderidae are demoted to a subfamily of the Paronellidae. Apart from the three living families, there are also two extinct ones known only from fossils.

 Family Paronellidae - includes Cyphoderidae
 Family Entomobryidae
 Family Microfalculidae
 Family Oncobryidae (fossil)
 Family Praentomobryidae (fossil)

Footnotes

References
 Soto-Adames, Felipe N.; Barra, Jean-Auguste; Christiansen, Kenneth & Jordana, Rafael (2008): Suprageneric Classification of Collembola Entomobryomorpha. Annals of the Entomological Society of America'' 101(3): 501–513. DOI:10.1603/0013-8746(2008)101[501:SCOCE]2.0.CO;2 HTML abstract

Entomobryomorpha
Arthropod superfamilies